Three ships of the Royal Navy have borne the name HMS Arabis, after the flower, the Arabis.

  was an  sloop launched in 1915 and sunk in 1916.
  was a  launched in 1940. She was transferred to the US Navy in 1942 as USS Saucy. She was returned in 1945, renamed HMS Snapdragon, and was sold in 1946.
The ship was returned to the Royal Navy in 1948 and scrapped in 1951.

See also
 , Royal Navy minesweeper class
 Arabis (disambiguation)

References
 
 

Royal Navy ship names